Celebrity Big Brother 15 was the fifteenth series of the British reality television series Celebrity Big Brother. The series launched on 7 January 2015 on Channel 5 and ended after 31 days on 6 February 2015; at the time it was the longest ever celebrity series. The seventeenth series in 2016 lasted a day longer with 32 days. It was the eighth celebrity series and the twelfth series of Big Brother overall to air on the channel. Emma Willis returned to host the series, whilst Rylan Clark continued to present the spin-off show Celebrity Big Brother's Bit on the Side alongside Willis. Repeats of the series aired on MTV, the first to do so. Willis decided to leave Big Brother's Bit on the Side after the end of this series, hosting her final show on 2 February 2015.

On 6 February 2015, Katie Price won the series, with Katie Hopkins finishing as the runner-up. This was the first series of Celebrity Big Brother where both the runner-up and the winner were women. Price also became the first female Housemate (and second overall after Brian Belo in Big Brother 8) on any series of Big Brother or Celebrity Big Brother to win the series after entering late. Price entered the House nine days after the original fourteen Housemates, and left 21 days later as the winner.

This series was the focus of much controversy after housemates Jeremy Jackson and Ken Morley were ejected within the first week. With an average audience of 3.09 million, this is the highest-rated series of Big Brother or Celebrity Big Brother to date on Channel 5.

Calum Best returned to the house for Celebrity Big Brother 19 as an All-Star, representing this series. He was the tenth housemate to be evicted.

Pre-series

Logo
The official eye logo was revealed on 8 December 2014. The logo fits in with the series' 'twisted fairy tale' theme, with entangled branches and leaves making up the eye's shape. Unlike other celebrity series', it doesn't feature the iconic "star" in the centre of the pupil to differentiate it from its civilian series.

Sponsorship
This series was sponsored by classified ad website Gumtree, with the company offering users of the site the chance to sell their items to furnish the House. Furniture from the house was later sold on the website to raise money for charity.

Bit on the Side scheduling
Big Brother's Bit on the Side will only air five days a week for the first time since it launched in 2011. Channel 5 opted not to renew the Saturday edition of Bit on the Psych and as a consequence Iain Lee will not be returning to the show in any capacity.

House
As you enter the House, the upper stair area is mirrored with flashes of trees. The stairs remain unchanged from the previous series. In the living area, grey sofas are in a square pattern, and a red mirror, significant to the series, is in the centre of the living area wall. The dining table is lipstick red, with fairy tale style props gracing the top. The kitchen is in a square corner with white marble counters and the latest appliances. The bedroom is dark and forest like, with a large owl watching over the Housemates. The garden is largely unchanged, except for the redecorated pod and new hot tub with seating area. No pool is present. Back inside, the bathroom is very chic with a large black bathtub. The diary room is in the style of a spooky purple/blue forest. The chair itself is faux wolf fur, blending into the background.

Housemates
On Day 1, fourteen Housemates entered the House. On Day 10, Katie Price entered the House as the fifteenth Housemate.

Alexander O'Neal
Alexander O'Neal is an American singer, best known for his internationally chart-topping singles such as "If You Were Here Tonight", "Fake" and "Criticize". He is also known for his duets with Cherelle on "Saturday Love" and "Never Knew Love Like This". In the United Kingdom, he appeared on a number of reality television shows including The Weakest Link, Just the Two of Us and Celebrity Wife Swap. He entered the House on Day 1, but as part of the launch night twist, he was automatically nominated for the first eviction. On Day 11, Alexander decided to walk from the Big Brother house, following an argument with Perez Hilton.

Alicia Douvall
Alicia Douvall (born Sarah Howes) is a British glamour model, businesswoman, actress, and television personality.  She is the founder and owner of Douvall's skincare company. She entered the House on Day 1. On Day 17, Alicia became the second housemate to be evicted.

Calum Best
Calum Best is a British-American former fashion model, television personality, and occasional actor. He is also known as the son of the late football icon, George Best and former Playboy model, Angie Best. He won the second series of Celebrity Love Island in 2006, and appeared in the ITV2 series Calum, Fran and Dangerous Danan, with Fran Cosgrave and Paul Danan. He was also featured in the MTV show Totally Calum Best, where it detailed Best's attempts to remain celibate for fifty days. Best has been romantically involved with Lindsay Lohan, Celebrity Big Brother 9 housemate Georgia Salpa and Alicia Douvall. On Day 1, Calum entered the House. On Day 31, Calum left the house in third place. He later returned to compete in Celebrity Big Brother 19 as an "All star" housemate.

Cami-Li
Cami-Li (born Camila Figueras) is a Puerto Rican-born American alternative model and television host, best known in the UK for her previous relationship with former The Only Way Is Essex star and Celebrity Big Brother 9 housemate Kirk Norcross. On Day 1, she entered the House. On Day 27, she was evicted during a live twist.

Chloe Goodman
Chloe Goodman is a British reality television star and model, who was featured as a cast member on the first series of MTV's Ex on the Beach. Goodman is also most notable for being a body double for Cheryl Fernandez-Versini in her L'Oreal adverts. She entered the House on Day 1, but was automatically nominated for the first eviction during the launch night twist. On Day 10, she became the first person to be evicted from the House.

Jeremy Jackson
Jeremy Jackson is an American actor and singer, who is most known for his role as Hobie Buchannon on the television show Baywatch. He appeared on the VH1 reality series Confessions of a Teen Idol, which chronicled the current careers of seven former teen idols (including Jackson), and their attempts to get back in front of the spotlight. On Day 1, Jeremy entered the House. He was ejected from the House on Day 4, due to an incident with Chloe Goodman in the toilet, the night before.

Katie Hopkins
Katie Hopkins is an English television personality and columnist, who first appeared on the third series of The Apprentice. On the show, she made herself memorable to viewers for her controversial and personal remarks towards the other candidates, despite turning down a place in the series final. She later took part in I'm a Celebrity...Get Me Out of Here!, as a replacement for Malcolm McLaren, and has since made various other media appearances. Her controversy spread further in the media with her opinions on classism, obesity, the unemployed, celebrities, and the Ebola virus. Hopkins currently writes a weekly column for The Sun newspaper. She was reportedly offered a record fee to appear on the show. On Day 1, Katie became the first to enter the House and was the subject of the launch night twist, selecting two of her fellow Housemates as the least entertaining. She chose Alexander and Chloe, who were therefore nominated for the first eviction. Due to her epilepsy, she also had her own bedroom in the house with ensuite bathroom. On Day 31, Hopkins was announced as the runner up of the series, behind Katie Price.

Katie Price
Katie Price, previously known by the pseudonym Jordan, is an English singer, television personality, novelist, businesswoman, and former glamour model. Her time as a topless glamour model in a pictorial Page 3 in the tabloid newspaper The Sun instantly shot Price into the limelight. From this, it allowed her to expand into a variety of different industries including television, books, fashion and music. She has had highly publicised relationships and has been married three times: to singer Peter Andre, to professional fighter and previous Celebrity Big Brother winner Alex Reid, and to builder and part-time stripper Kieran Hayler. She entered the House on Day 10, to a ball thrown in her honour. On Day 31, Price was announced as the winner of the series.

Kavana
Kavana (born Anthony Kavanagh) is a British singer and actor, who enjoyed a number of chart singles including "I Can Make You Feel Good", "MFEO" and "Will You Wait for Me?". He was the runner-up on the first series of Grease Is the Word, and auditioned for The Voice UK in 2013. In 2014, Kavana took part in  series 2 of The Big Reunion with Gareth Gates, Adam Rickitt and previous Celebrity Big Brother contestants Kenzie and Dane Bowers, where they formed the supergroup 5th Story. He entered the House on Day 1. Kavana was evicted in a double eviction on Day 29, two days from the final.

Keith Chegwin
Keith Chegwin was an English television presenter and actor, who had become a household name by presenting programmes such as Multicoloured Swap Shop, Cheggers Plays Pop and Saturday Superstore. Chegwin is known for his off the cuff ad-lib style of broadcasting. His career regained speed in 1993, when he presented the "Down Your Doorstep" outside broadcast segment for The Big Breakfast, in which he cried: "Wake up you beggars, it's Cheggars!". He also worked for seven years on GMTV, and took part in Dancing on Ice. Keith entered the House on Day 1. On Day 31, he left the house in fourth place. He died on 11 December 2017.

Ken Morley
Ken Morley is an English actor and comedian, best known for playing the roles of Reg Holdsworth in the ITV soap opera Coronation Street from 1989 to 1995, and as General Leopold von Flockenstuffen in the BBC sitcom 'Allo 'Allo! from 1988 to 1991. Ken entered the House on Day 1. On Day 4, Ken received a formal warning for using unacceptable and offensive language and on Day 6, he was removed from the House for repeatedly using this  language.

Michelle Visage
Michelle Visage (born Michelle Lynn Shupack) is an American singer, television host, radio DJ, and television personality, best known for being one of the judges on Logo TV's RuPaul's Drag Race, where she replaced Merle Ginsberg from its third season. She is also known as a member of U.S. female R&B and dance vocal trio Seduction, who spanned several hit songs including "Two to Make It Right". Visage provided vocals for The S.O.U.L. S.Y.S.T.E.M.'s "It's Gonna Be a Lovely Day", which was included on The Bodyguard soundtrack. She entered the House on Day 1. On Day 31, she left the house in fifth place.

Nadia Sawalha
Nadia Sawalha is an English actress and television presenter, best known for her role as businesswoman Annie Palmer in the BBC One soap opera, EastEnders from 1997 to 1999. She became a regular panellist on the ITV lunchtime chat show Loose Women from 1999 to 2002; before returning in 2013. After winning the second series of Celebrity MasterChef, Sawalha has continued to make appearances on cookery shows, not only as a presenter, but also as a chef. On Day 1, Nadia entered the House. On Day 24, she became the fourth housemate to be evicted.

Patsy Kensit
Patsy Kensit is an English actress, singer, and model, who is best known for portraying the roles of Sadie King in Emmerdale from 2004 to 2006, and Faye Byrne in the BBC medical drama series Holby City from 2007 until 2010. She also played Rika van den Hass in Lethal Weapon 2. Aside from her acting career, Kensit has been notable for her marriages to musicians Dan Donovan, Jim Kerr, Liam Gallagher and Jeremy Healy, but also as the front vocalist in the band, Eighth Wonder. She entered the House on Day 1.
She became the third housemate to be evicted from the house on Day 21.

Perez Hilton
Mario Lavandeira, Jr., known professionally as Perez Hilton (a play on "Paris Hilton"), is an American blogger, social media influencer, columnist, and television personality. His blog, Perezhilton.com (formerly PageSixSixSix.com), is known for its posts covering celebrity gossip and showcasing tabloid photographs, over which he adds his own captions or "doodles". The website has garnered negative attention for its attitude, its former outing of alleged closeted celebrities, and its role in the increasing coverage of celebrities in all forms of media. From this, he has had celebrity feuds with Lady Gaga, Lily Allen and will.i.am. On Day 1, Perez entered the House. His time in the house had garnered much media attention, due to his controversial behaviour towards fellow housemates and his provocative antics. On Day 29, he was evicted in a double eviction.

Summary

Nominations table

Notes

Ratings
Official ratings are taken from BARB.

References

External links

2015 British television seasons
15
Channel 5 (British TV channel) reality television shows